John Skerrett may refer to:

John Skerrett (mayor), mayor of Galway
John Skerrett (Augustinian), Irish preacher and missionary
John Byrne Skerrett (1778–1814), British soldier who fought in the Peninsular War in Spain.